Elections to the French National Assembly were held in Niger on 17 June 1951 as part of the wider French elections. The Union of Nigerien Independents and Sympathisers won both seats, taken by Georges Condat and Zodi Ikhia

Campaign
The Independent List included François Borrey, who had unsuccessfully contested the November 1946 elections, and Dabo Aboudakar.

Results

References

Niger
1951 in Niger
Elections in Niger